Richard Henry Richard Howard-Vyse (24 August 1813 – 12 June 1872) was a British Conservative Party politician.

Born in 1813, Howard-Vyse was the son of Howard Vyse. In 1856, he married Julia Agnes Jolliffe, daughter of William Joliffe and Eleanor (née Paget) Jolliffe, and they had at least one son: Howard Henry Howard-Vyse (1858–1927).

Howard-Vyse was elected Conservative MP for South Northamptonshire at a by-election in 1846—caused by the resignation of William Ralph Cartwright—and held the seat until 1857 when he was defeated. He later returned to Parliament for Windsor at a by-election in 1863—caused by the death of George William Hope—but lost the seat at the next general election in 1865.

Howard-Vyse was also a Justice of the Peace and a colonel in the Royal Horse Guards.

References

External links
 

UK MPs 1859–1865
1813 births
1872 deaths
Conservative Party (UK) MPs for English constituencies